Diego Ibáñez de la Madrid y Bustamente (1649–1694) was a Roman Catholic prelate who served as Bishop of Ceuta (1687–1694), Bishop of Pozzuoli (1684–1687), and Bishop of Trivento (1679–1684).

Biography
Diego Ibáñez de la Madrid y Bustamente was born on 7 Apr 1649 in Comillas, Spain and ordained a priest on 17 Feb 1674.
On 24 Oct 1678, he was selected  as Bishop of Trivento and confirmed by Pope Innocent XI on 10 Apr 1679.
On 16 Apr 1679, he was consecrated bishop by Carlo Pio di Savoia, Cardinal-Priest of San Crisogono, with Francesco Casati, Titular Archbishop of Trapezus, and Gregorio Carducci, Bishop of Valva e Sulmona, serving as co-consecrators.
On 2 Oct 1684, he was appointed during the papacy of Pope Innocent XI as Bishop of Pozzuoli.
On 9 Jun 1687, he was appointed during the papacy of Pope Innocent XI as Bishop of Ceuta.
He served as Bishop of Ceuta until his death on 5 Apr 1694.

References

External links and additional sources
 (for Chronology of Bishops) 
 (for Chronology of Bishops) 
 (for Chronology of Bishops) 
 (for Chronology of Bishops)  
 (for Chronology of Bishops) 
 (for Chronology of Bishops) 

17th-century Roman Catholic bishops in Africa
Bishops appointed by Pope Innocent XI
1649 births
1694 deaths
17th-century Italian Roman Catholic bishops
Bishops of Pozzuoli
Bishops of Ceuta